Fahad Khamees Mubarak (born 24 January 1962) is an Emirati retired footballer who played as a striker for the UAE national football team and Al Wasl FC in Dubai. He played in the 1990 FIFA World Cup and was the captain of the team in the matches against Colombia and Yugoslavia.

Club career statistics

External links 
 

1962 births
Living people
Sportspeople from Dubai
Emirati footballers
1984 AFC Asian Cup players
1988 AFC Asian Cup players
1990 FIFA World Cup players
Al-Wasl F.C. players
Al-Nasr SC (Dubai) players
UAE Pro League players
United Arab Emirates international footballers
Association football forwards